Raunaq is a 1944 Bollywood film directed by Dwarka Khosla and starring Chandraprabha, Noor Mohammad Charlie (billed as Charlie), Chandra Mohan, Motilal and Subarnalata Subarnalata. It was released in 1944.

Music
"Duniya Kisi Ko Haye Majbur Na Kare" - Hamida Banu
"Ghunghat Me Haule Haule Bole Dulhan" - N/A
"Hum Dil Ko Lutaate Hai" - Hamida Banu
"Teri Na Me Kuch Nihan Hai" - N/A
"Aye Dard Itna Badh Jaa" - N/A
"Ek Kahar Barpa Karta Hai" - Charlie
"O Saawariya Na Tarsa" - N/A
"Wah Sapne Jo Mann Bhaye" - Srimati Ghosh
"Ye Kaisi Ladaai" - N/A
"Zara Bansi Baja" - Srimati Ghosh

References

External links
 

1944 films
1940s Hindi-language films
Films scored by C. Ramchandra
Indian black-and-white films